Karin Randoja is a Canadian theatre director and dramaturge. A partner with Anna Chatterton and Evalyn Parry in the theatre collective Independent Aunties, she is most noted for her work on the play Gertrude and Alice, which was a shortlisted finalist for the Dora Mavor Moore Award for Outstanding New Play in 2016 and for the Governor General's Award for English-language drama at the 2018 Governor General's Awards.

References

21st-century Canadian dramatists and playwrights
Canadian women dramatists and playwrights
Canadian theatre directors
Writers from Toronto
Living people
21st-century Canadian women writers
Year of birth missing (living people)